
Gmina Warka is an urban-rural gmina (administrative district) in Grójec County, Masovian Voivodeship, in east-central Poland.

Villages
Apart from the town of Warka, Gmina Warka contains the villages and settlements of Bończa, Borowe, Branków, Brzezinki, Budy Michałowskie, Budy Opożdżewskie, Dębnowola, Gąski, Gośniewice, Grażyna, Grzegorzewice, Gucin, Hornigi, Kalina, Kazimierków, Klonowa Wola, Konary, Krześniaków, Laski, Lechanice, Magierowa Wola, Michalczew, Michałów Dolny, Michałów Górny, Michałów-Parcele, Murowanka, Niwy Ostrołęckie, Nowa Ostrołęka, Nowa Wieś, Nowe Biskupice, Nowe Grzegorzewice, Opożdżew, Oskardów, Ostrołęka, Ostrówek, Palczew, Palczew-Parcela, Paulin, Piaseczno, Pilica, Podgórzyce, Prusy, Przylot, Stara Warka, Stare Biskupice, Wichradz, Wola Palczewska, Wrociszew and Zastruże.

Neighbouring gminas
Gmina Warka is bordered by the gminas of Białobrzegi, Chynów, Góra Kalwaria, Grabów nad Pilicą, Jasieniec, Magnuszew, Promna, Sobienie-Jeziory, Stromiec and Wilga.

References
Polish official population figures 2006

Warka
Grójec County